Metin Aktaş (born 1 August 1977) is a Turkish footballer who last played as a goalkeeper for Adana Demirspor in 2012. Aktaş was a member of the Turkey squad at the 2000 UEFA European Under-21 Football Championship.

Honours

Club
Trabzonspor
Turkish Cup: 2002–03

References

External links
 

1977 births
Living people
People from Akçaabat
Turkish footballers
Turkey international footballers
Turkey B international footballers
Turkey under-21 international footballers
Turkey youth international footballers
Akçaabat Sebatspor footballers
Trabzonspor footballers
Kayserispor footballers
Diyarbakırspor footballers
Çaykur Rizespor footballers
Giresunspor footballers
Şanlıurfaspor footballers
Adana Demirspor footballers
Süper Lig players

Association football goalkeepers